Pelodiscus is a genus of turtles in the family Trionychidae, the softshells. Based on genetic and morphological analysis there are seven valid species. They are native to Eastern Asia, ranging from the Amur region, south through China and Korea, as far south as Vietnam. Populations in Japan are thought to likely originate from historic human introductions.

Phylogenetic studies have recovered a high diversity of Pelodiscus genotypes in China, some of which may correspond to distinct species. However, the millennia-old practice of farming Pelodiscus for consumption, especially in large-scale turtle farms since the late 20th century, is thought to threaten these lineages due to hybridization with farmed individuals.

Species
Pelodiscus axenaria  — Hunan softshell turtle
Pelodiscus huangshanensis  — Huangshan softshell turtle, horse-hoof softshell turtle
Pelodiscus maackii  — Amur softshell turtle, northern Chinese softshell turtle
Pelodiscus parviformis  — lesser Chinese softshell turtle
Pelodiscus shipian  — Chinese stone slab softshell turtle
Pelodiscus sinensis  — Chinese softshell turtle
Pelodiscus variegatus  — spotted softshell turtle

Nota bene: In the above list,  a binomial authority in parentheses indicates that the species was originally described in a genus other than Pelodiscus.

References

Further reading
 (in German and Latin).

 
Turtle genera
Taxa named by Leopold Fitzinger